Alan García (1949–2019) was the 117th and 124th president of Peru.

Alan García may also refer to:

 Al Ernest Garcia (1887–1938), American actor
 Alan Garcia (jockey) (born 1985), Peruvian horse racing jockey
 Alan García (footballer) (born 1993), Mexican footballer